Yomi Denzel Olaniyi (born 1 August 1996), is a Swiss entrepreneur and YouTuber.

Early life, education and beginnings 
Yomi Denzel Olaniyi was born in Lausanne, Switzerland, into a family of modest means. His father was an undocumented immigrant from Nigeria; his mother, who had no formal education, worked in human resources in a large company. He is the brother of former basketball player Kaanu Olaniyi. During his youth, Olaniyi was an amateur soccer player.

At the age of 14, he launched his YouTube channel with gaming content. He discovered drop shipping in 2017, after creating his online marketing agency. He reached the rank of sergeant in the army. He studied at HEC Lausanne and Harvard University.

Career 
He became a millionaire in less than a year with e-commerce and online training business.

He builds his fame through millions of dollars in sales from dropshipping on the Shopify platform and by running contests on Instagram designed to win prestigious prizes.

Mindeo 
Since 2018, he has been the founder of an online training company, renamed Mindeo in 2022.

Minea 
In 2021, he founded a SaaS, named Minea, which aims to analyze data for e-commerce.

Awards and nominations

References

External links 
 Official website

1996 births
Living people
People from Lausanne
Swiss YouTubers
21st-century Swiss businesspeople
Harvard University alumni
Swiss people of Nigerian descent
University of Lausanne alumni